Boland may refer to:

People with the surname
Boland (baseball), a 19th-century baseball player
Boland brothers (early 20th century), Frank, James, and Joseph; early American aircraft designers
Akeel Boland (born 1991), BJJ Practitioner, Good Jitsu/Bad back 
Adam Boland (born 1977), Australian television personality
Bernie Boland (1892–1973), American professional baseball player
Bob Boland, Australian rugby league footballer and coach
Bridget Boland (1913–1988), British playwright
Charles W. Boland (1939–1961), Canadian jockey; killed in racing accident
Derek Boland, better known as Derek B (1965–2009), British rap producer and artist
Eamon Boland (born 1947), English actor
Eavan Boland (1944–2020), Irish poet
Eddie Boland (1883–1935), American film actor
Edward Boland (1911–2001), American politician from Massachusetts; U.S. representative 1953–89
Elizabeth Boland (born 1991), Canadian singer-songwriter who uses the performing name Lowell
Ernest Bertrand Boland (born 1925), American Roman Catholic bishop
Francy Boland (1929–2005), Belgian jazz composer and pianist
Frederick Boland (1904–1985), Irish government minister and ambassador; father of Eavan Boland
Gerald Boland (1885–1973), Irish nationalist and politician; TD for Roscommon and government minister; brother of Harry Boland; father of Kevin Boland
Halema Boland (born 1980), Kuwaiti television host
Harold Boland (1891–1956), Australian trade unionist
Harry Boland (1887–1922), Irish nationalist; brother of Gerald Boland
J. Kevin Boland (born 1935), Irish-American Roman Catholic prelate; Bishop of Savannah, Georgia
James Boland (1856–1895) Irish Republican; father of Gerald and Harry Boland
Jason Boland, lead guitar player of the American country music quintet Jason Boland & the Stragglers
Jason Boland (bassist) (born 1987), bassist for Kodaline
Joey Boland (born 1987), Irish hurler
John Boland (disambiguation), several people
Katie Boland (born 1988), Canadian actress
Kevin Boland (1917–2001), Irish politician and government minister; son of Gerald Boland
Mary Boland (1880–1965), American stage and film actress
Mike Boland (disambiguation), several people
Michael Boland (cinematographer), won 1992 Emmy Award 
 Patrick Boland, Irish founder of Boland's Bakery
Patrick J. Boland (1880–1942), American politician from Pennsylvania; U.S. representative 1931–42
Paul Boland (contemporary), American comedian, impressionist, and singer
Raymond James Boland (1932–2014), American Roman Catholic Bishop of Birmingham, Alabama
Scott Boland (born 1989), Australian cricket bowler
Thomas Aloysius Boland (1896–1979), American Roman Catholic prelate; Archbishop of Newark 1952–74
Tom Boland (fl. 1909–1917), Scottish professional football player
Veronica Grace Boland (1899–1982), American politician from Pennsylvania; U.S. representative 1942–43
Warren Boland (born 1955), Australian radio personality and former professional rugby league footballer
Willie Boland (born 1975), Irish professional football player
William Boland Supply Chain professional in Aerospace Industry
Murchadh Ua Beolláin, d. 1053

Places
Bolands, a coastal village on Antigua
Boland Lake (Nipissing District), a lake in Nipissing District, Ontario, Canada
Boland, Iran, in Fars Province, Iran
Boland, County Tyrone, a townland in County Tyrone, Northern Ireland
Boland's Mill, a former flour mill and bakery in Dublin, Ireland
The Boland, Western Cape, a region in South Africa

Sports
 Boland Cavaliers, South African rugby union team
 Boland cricket team, South African cricket team

Other
 Boland's Bakery, former Irish baking company and owner of Boland's Mill